San Augustine may stand for:

 San Augustine
 San Augustine County, Texas 
 San Augustine Independent School District
 San Augustine County Courthouse and Jail